Edna Pauline Plumstead (née Janisch) (15 September 1903 Cape Town – 23 September 1989 Johannesburg) was a South African palaeobotanist, of the Bernard Price Institute for Palaeontological Research, University of the Witwatersrand, Johannesburg, where she graduated in 1924. Edna lived in Cape Town the first seven years of her life and that is where she would explore and find wild flowers in the Cape Peninsula. Plumstead would later on connect the wild flowers to the same one in places like Australia and South America when she would later on defend the continental drift. She first began defending the theory of continental drift in the 1950s and has been described as one 'of South Africa's foremost scientists in the field of Gondwana paleobotany and geology'. Plumstead was awarded the Chrestian Mica Gondwanaland Medal by the Geological Society of India, and was made a Fellow of the Royal Society of South Africa.

Edna Plumstead graduated in 1924 from the Witwatersrand University with a B.Sc. (Hons.) in geology and took up an appointment with the Geology Department. Her dissertation for her master's degree was highly regarded by the Geological Society of South Africa leading to her being the first recipient of the Corstorphine Medal. She joined the Bernard Price Institute in 1965 from the Geology Department. At the time she was studying plant fossils collected in Antarctica, and gradually became convinced that sedimentary rocks of the same age in Antarctica, South Africa, South America, India and Australia contained essentially identical plant fossils. These species were dated from the late Palaeozoic onwards.

Although this was long before general acceptance of 'continental-drift', plate tectonics and sea-floor spreading, some saw the Antarctic fossil plants as compelling evidence for the existence of the former 'super-continent', Gondwana. Some five years after the palaeobotanical evidence was announced to the world, James Kitching added the evidence of vertebrate fossils to this debate when he joined the United States Antarctic Research Group on a visit in 1970, and collected vertebrate fossils identical to those he was accustomed to finding in the Karoo.

Her work 
Edna Plumstead lived in Africa, a country where Wegener’s theory of Continental drift was valid and taught in schools, which was different from North America and Europe where the theory had been rejected. Therefore, she was influenced by Wegener’s hypothesis and became especially interested about the fact that early life on the earth was not evenly distributed, but that it was divided in zones. She also learned about the speculation of an ancient continent called Gondwanaland and decided to study more about it. She made her most significant discovery in 1952, which was the fructification of Glossopteris, the ubiquitous Permian plant of Gondwana, and later became an expert on the matter.

During her investigations, she compared the floras of the Southern and Northern Hemispheres, and with it she observed that some countries, including Africa, South America, India, Australia and Antarctica had similar floras in the past. Her observation was important because it served as a prove of the existence of Gondwana. We can read about it in her book “The Case for Continental Drift”.

For her investigation there were two important questions that she asked and tried to resolve. The first one was: “If the position of the continents had not changed how could the same genera and even species of plants have migrated east, west and south across the wide oceans which now are separate them but have failed to reach North America, Europe and Asia along easy routes?” The second question was: “If the climatic zones were the same, how can we explain the fact that the fossil plants of peninsular India are closely comparable, and often identical with those of Australia, Africa south of the Sahara, Argentina and Brazil but above all, with those found in the heart of Antarctica at 86˚S where today no vascular plant could live?”

Plumstead also played a role in the development of the mobilism theory as she provided better information about Glossopteris that contributed to the interpretation and understanding of the division of Gondwana. She became an authentic voice for mobilism.

Her work, together with that of Wegener, du Toit and Martin helped Warren Hamilton, who was a supporter of the continental drift theory, to develop his theory on mobilism which he then applied in America.

Plumstead was the first to describe the strange fertile structures of the Glossopteris plant found in organic connection to leaves. Also, during her research, in her review of “Paleobotany in Antarctica”; she came to the conclusion that it is inevitable that evidence from Antarctica demands a more plausible phytogeographical explanation than any that was given before, and seems to be satisfied by the acceptance of some form of continental drift.

As a paleobotanist as well, she studied fossils and was especially interested on how fossils of the same species ended up on different continents-she uses Gondwana to explain this. Her papers on continental drift were widely discussed and important for her own development in her research of fossils. Warren Hamilton, who was a supporter of mobilism and went to Africa to find evidence to support his theory, while in Africa he read the work of Plumstead -it was thanks to her (and two other people) that he was able to prove his theory of mobilism true. Plumstead made a great contribution to the understanding of Glossopteris, providing key evidence confirming the mobilist interpretation of Gondwana. Through much of Plumstead's work and research other scientists have been able to confirm their own theories which have helped us to know about the world as it is today.

Partial list of publications
E. P. Plumstead, ‘Description of two new genera and six new species of fructifications borne on Glossopteris leaves from South Africa’, Trans Geol Soc S Afr, 55 (1952), 281–328
E. P. Plumstead, ‘Bisexual fructifications borne on Glossopteris leaves from South Africa. Palaeontographica, 100B (1956),1–25
Edna P. Plumstead, Bisexual fructification borne on Glossopteris leaves from South Africa (Stuttgart, E. Schweizerbart, 1956)
Edna P. Plumstead, Coal in Southern Africa (Johannesburg: Witwatersrand University Press, 1957)
Edna P. Plumstead, On Ottokaria, the fructification of Gangamopteris (Johannesburg : Hortors Ltd., [1957?])
E. P. Plumstead, ‘Further fructifications of the Glossopteridae and a provisional classification based on them’, Trans Geol Soc S Afr, 61 (1958), 52–74
Edna P. Plumstead and R Kraűsel. Fossil floras of Antarctica (London: Trans-Antarctic Expedition Committee, 1962)
Edna P. Plumstead, Three Thousand Million Years of Plant Life in Africa (Johannesburg: Geological Society of South Africa, 1969)
Edna P. Plumstead, ‘Plenary paper on Gondwana paleobotany’ (1970)
Edna P. Plumstead, A new assemblage of plant fossils from Milorgfjella, Dronning Maud Land (Cambridge : British Antarctic Survey, 1975)
Books by her published:
Fossil Floras of Antarctica-1 edition published in English in 1962
Section Drawing of Simple Geological Maps-8 editions published in English between 1938 and 1946
Geology-1 edition published in English in 1962

References 

'A Woman's achievement in a man's world: profile of Edna Plumstead' (CSIR, 1970)
Papers prepared especially in honour of Dr. Edna P. Plumstead (1976)
R.J. Rayner, ‘Obituaries: Edna Pauline Plumstead (1903-1989)’, International Organisation of Paleobotony Newsletter, 39 (1989), 14-15
‘In Memorium: Edna Plumstead’, Sagittarius - Magazine of the South African Museum, 4:4 (December 1989)
J.M. Maguire, ‘Obituary: Edna P Plumstead (1903-89), South African Journal of Science, 85 (1989), 695-6
Colin MacRae, Life Etched in Stone: Fossils of South Africa (Johannesburg: Geological Society of South Africa, 1999)
Prevec, R.; McLoughlin, S and M. K. Bamford. ‘Novel double wing morphology revealed in a South African ovuliferous glossopterid fructification: Bifariala intermittens(Plumstead 1958) comb. nov.’, Review of Palaeobotany and Palynology, 150:1-4 (May 2008), 22-36
Harufumi Nishida, Kathleen B. Pigg, Kensuke Kudo and John F. Rigby. ‘New evidence of reproductive organs of Glossopteris based on permineralized fossils from Queensland, Australia. I. Ovulate organ Homevaleia gen. nov.’ Journal of Plant Research, Volume 120:4 (July, 2007)

Paleobotanists
Women paleontologists
1989 deaths
1903 births
20th-century South African botanists
South African women botanists
20th-century South African women scientists
University of the Witwatersrand alumni
Fellows of the Royal Society of South Africa